Shakakom (also Romanized as Shakākom) is a village in Baz Kia Gurab Rural District, in the Central District of Lahijan County, Gilan Province, Iran. At the 2006 census, its population was 391, in 120 families.

References 

Populated places in Lahijan County